Earl Harrison is an Australian former professional rugby league footballer who played in the 1960s. A New South Wales state and Australia national representative five-eighth, he played his club football in Country NSW for Gilgandra.

After gaining selection for the Country New South Wales rugby league team and then the New South Wales team in 1963,  Harrison made his international debut for Australia against the visiting New Zealand side, becoming Kangaroo No. 378. 

He was later selected to go on the 1963-64 Kangaroo tour of England and France.  On that tour he was part of the first all-Australian side to win the rugby league Ashes in England, playing at five-eighth in all three Tests against Great Britain and he played in one Test against France.

References

Australian rugby league players
Australia national rugby league team players
New South Wales rugby league team players
Country New South Wales rugby league team players
Rugby league five-eighths